Ohan is a common masculine Armenian name and can be used as a nickname for Hovhannes or Ohannes.

Ohan may refer to:

People
Ohan Durian (1922–2011), Armenian conductor
Mikho-Ohan, pen name of Armenian writer Nar-Dos

Films
Ohan (film), 1984 Japanese film directed by Kon Ichikawa

Others
Oak Hill Association of Neighborhoods (abbreviated OHAN), an association in Oak Hill, Austin, Texas

See also
Ohanian, an Armenian surname
Ohannes (disambiguation)
Hovhannes (disambiguation)